"Taking It All in Stride" is a song written by Tom Snow and recorded by New Zealand-born singer songwriter, Mark Williams. The song was released in November 1976 as the lead single from his third studio album, Taking It All In Stride (1977). The song peaked at number 14 on the New Zealand charts.

Track listing
 7" single (EMI – HR 557)
Side A: "Taking It All in Stride"
Side B: "Why Can't We Be Lovers"

Chart performance

References

1976 singles
1976 songs
Mark Williams (singer) songs
EMI Records singles
Songs written by Tom Snow